Personality–job fit theory is a form of organizational psychology that postulates that an individual's personality traits will reveal insight into their adaptability within an organization. The degree of confluence between a person and the organization is expressed as their Person-Organization (P-O) fit. This is also referred to as a person–environment fit. A common measure of the P-O fit is workplace efficacy - the rate at which workers are able to complete tasks. These tasks are affected by environmental factors within the workplace. For example, a worker who is more efficient working as an individual, rather than in a team, will have a higher P-O fit for a workplace that stresses individual tasks (such as accountancy). By matching the right personality with the right job, company workers can achieve a better synergy and avoid pitfalls such as high turnover and low job satisfaction. Employees are more likely to stay committed to organizations if the fit is 'good'.

In practice, P-O fit would be used to gauge integration with organizational competencies. The individual is assessed on these competencies, which reveals efficacy, motivation, influence, and co-worker respect. Competencies can be assessed using various tools like psychological tests, assessment centres competency based interview, situational analysis, etc.

If an individual displays a high P-O fit, we can say that they would most likely be able to adjust to the company environment and work culture, and perform at an optimum level.

See also
 Aptitude
 Onboarding
 Person-environment fit
 Social influence
 Trait activation theory

Notes

Organizational behavior